The Central Valley Titans is a team in the American Basketball Association based in Exeter, California. Established in 2010 as the Mid Valley Titans, the team changed its name for their second season of 2011-12.

Home games are played on the campus of Exeter Union High School.

Season-by-season results

References

External links
Central Valley Titans on USbasket

Defunct American Basketball Association (2000–present) teams
Basketball teams in California
Sports in Tulare County, California
2010 establishments in California
Basketball teams established in 2010